Mustafa Kemal "Muzzy" Izzet (born 31 October 1974) is a former professional footballer who played as a midfielder for Chelsea, Leicester City, Birmingham City. Born in England, he represented the Turkey national team internationally.

Early life
His father is a Turkish Cypriot who came to England as a small boy, and his mother is English. His younger brother, Kemal, also became a professional footballer.

Club career

Leicester City
Izzet signed as a schoolboy for Chelsea, but never made a first team appearance during three years at the London club. He moved to Leicester City in March 1996 on loan for the rest of the season. He became a regular in the side, scoring one goal. When Leicester beat Crystal Palace in the play-offs, Izzet was able to make his move permanent for a fee of £800,000. He kept his place in the side for their Premier League season, which was successful for City. They came 9th in the Premier League, and won the League Cup. Izzet formed a partnership in midfield with Neil Lennon, which proved vital for Leicester. 

In the 1998–99 season, Leicester came 10th in league, and reaching the League Cup final again, but lost out to Tottenham Hotspur. The following season, Leicester came 8th, and again got to the League Cup Final, this time coming up against Tranmere Rovers, of Division One. This year they won 2–1, with Matt Elliott getting both goals. Izzet had been a regular in the side through all of this time. After Martin O'Neill left, Izzet remained a Leicester player. His time at Leicester drew interest from West Ham and Middlesbrough, but he did not leave the club.

The following season started with a 5–0 home defeat to newly promoted Bolton Wanderers. Despite pledging to stay at Leicester during pre-season, Izzet handed in a transfer request in autumn of 2001, prior to the club's relegation, but he rejected a move to Middlesbrough as he did not want to be seen to be "jumping ship". He did issue a plea to O'Neill, who was now manager of Scottish Premier League side Celtic, to sign him in May 2002, remarking that "only an idiot wouldn't consider joining Celtic." Following their relegation at the end of the 2001–02 season, Izzet was again strongly touted for a move to Boro. However, Leicester insisted they would not accept a reduced offer from Middlesbrough for Izzet, who was priced at £6 million, and no deal came to fruition. He withdrew his transfer request in March 2003, after the club achieved automatic promotion by finishing in second place. In January 2004, Leicester rejected £500,000 bids from Aston Villa and Blackburn Rovers for Izzet. At the end of the 2003–04 season, Leicester were again relegated. Izzet was Leicester's standout player during the season, assisting on 14 of the club's 48 goals, or 29% of the goals the Foxes scored. Unable to afford Izzet's £30,000 per week wages, the club admitted he was leaving.

Birmingham City
Izzet joined Birmingham City in June 2004 on a free transfer, signing a three-year deal. Injury plagued his first season, with him making only a handful of appearances, though he did score his first league goal for Birmingham, an equaliser against Bolton Wanderers. His second season was worse, with a knee injury keeping him out for a long period of time. Izzet announced his retirement from football on 27 June 2006.

Thurmaston Town
On 28 November 2009, Izzet made a shock last minute return to Saturday football with Leicestershire Senior League side Thurmaston Town. However, he admitted days later that his knee was still very sore and was quoted saying "whether I can turn out for Thurmaston every week is another thing." He never played for them again.

International career 
Izzet qualified for the Turkey national side through his Turkish-Cypriot father. He was included in the Turkey squad for Euro 2000, making his debut and sole appearance in the tournament in the group stage as Turkey drew 0–0 with Sweden. He was also part of the squad for the 2002 World Cup, featuring again just once, as a substitute in the 1–0 semi-final defeat to Brazil.

In total, Izzet made nine appearances for the national side.

Later career
Izzet now runs a football academy with fellow former professional footballer and former Leicester teammate Steve Walsh.
In September 2015 Izzet's autobiography was published, titled Muzzy: My Story. The autobiography was co-written with Leicester Mercury writer Lee Marlow.

Izzet is an ambassador for Dorothy Goodman School, a Special Educational Needs school in Hinckley, Leicestershire.

Career statistics

International

Honours
Leicester City
Football League Cup: 1996–97, 1999–2000; runner-up: 1998–99
Football League First Division play-offs: 1996

Turkey
FIFA World Cup third place: 2002

Individual
Premier League Player of the Month: September 1999
Most assists in the Premier League: 2003–04
PFA Team of the Year: 2002–03 First Division

References

External links

1974 births
Living people
Footballers from Mile End
English footballers
Turkish footballers
Turkey international footballers
Association football midfielders
Senrab F.C. players
Chelsea F.C. players
Leicester City F.C. players
Birmingham City F.C. players
English Football League players
Premier League players
UEFA Euro 2000 players
2002 FIFA World Cup players
Sportspeople of Turkish Cypriot descent
Turkish people of Cypriot descent
Turkish people of English descent
English people of Turkish Cypriot descent
English people of Turkish descent